Westminster United Church of Christ, originally the First Congregational Church, is a historic church in the Cliff/Cannon neighborhood of Spokane, Washington. It is affiliated with the United Church of Christ.

The current building was built in 1890 in a Richardsonian Romanesque style and enlarged in 1927 to include larger towers and a Sunday School. Soon afterwards, the congregation merged with Westminster Presbyterian Church. The building was added to the National Register of Historic Places in 1978.

References

External links

Churches on the National Register of Historic Places in Washington (state)
Romanesque Revival church buildings in Washington (state)
Churches completed in 1890
Buildings and structures in Spokane, Washington
National Register of Historic Places in Spokane, Washington
Churches in Spokane County, Washington